Adrian Purzycki (born 2 August 1997 in Siedlce) is a Polish professional footballer who plays for Arka Gdynia as a defensive midfielder. He holds Polish as well as UK citizenship.

Club career

Wigan Athletic U18 
Purzycki began his career in the youth ranks of Wigan Athletic in 2013.

Fortuna Sittard 
He made his professional debut in the Eerste Divisie for Fortuna Sittard on 5 August 2016 in a game against Achilles '29.

Miedź Legnica 
In 2017 Purzycki joined Miedź Legnica, a Polish I liga football team.

International career

Poland youth 
Purzycki has represented Poland at various youth levels since his debut for the Poland U18 in 2014.

References

External links
 

1997 births
People from Siedlce
Living people
Polish footballers
Polish expatriate footballers
Fortuna Sittard players
Miedź Legnica players
Górnik Polkowice players
Arka Gdynia players
Expatriate footballers in the Netherlands
Eerste Divisie players
Ekstraklasa players
I liga players
III liga players
Poland youth international footballers
Association football midfielders